The River Lee Diversion is located in the Lea Valley, close to Enfield Lock and to the north east corner of the King George V Reservoir.

History 
As its name implies, the River Lea was diverted to accommodate the construction of the Chingford Reservoirs and the Banbury Reservoir.

Course 
Before skirting the eastern boundary of the King George V Reservoir, the river is joined by the River Lee Flood Relief Channel. The man-made, steep, concrete-banked water flows under Lea Valley Road (A110 road), before forming a boundary with the William Girling Reservoir. It flows under the North Circular Road at the Lea Valley Viaduct before skirting the western perimeter of the Banbury Reservoir, then flows close and parallel to the River Lee Navigation, passing to the west of the Lockwood Reservoir. It continues past Stonebridge Lock and Tottenham Lock, then merges with the River Lee Navigation below Ferry Lane (A503 road).

Water supply
The river feeds water to some of the reservoirs in the Lee Valley Reservoir Chain.

Ecology 
The clean, well oxygenated, concrete–lined, fast flowing water provides the ideal environment for the barbel. Also, of note is the fish–eating bird the goosander which feeds in the river.

Access 
Access is limited as the river mainly flows through Thames Water property.

References

Rivers of London
London water infrastructure
Thames Water